The Una Himachal - New Delhi  Jan Shatabdi Express is a Superfast Express train belonging to Indian Railways - Northern Railway Division that runs between Una Himachal and New Delhi in India.

It operates as train number 12058 from Una Himachal to New Delhi Via Chandigarh Junction and Train number 12057 in the reverse direction.

It serves the states of Himachal Pradesh, Punjab, Haryana, Delhi. Initially it ran up to Chandigarh and being extended to Una Himachal in year 2008.

Coaches

The 12058/57 Una Himachal - New Delhi Janshatabdi Express presently has 4 AC Chair Car and 8 Second Class Jan Shatabdi seating coaches.

As with most train services in India, Coach Composition may be amended at the discretion of Indian Railways depending on demand.

Service

The 12057/58 New Delhi Una Janshatabdi Express covers the distance of 410 kilometres in 7 hours 35 mins (54.07 km/hr) as 12057 New Delhi Una Jan Shatabdi Express and in 7 hours 00 mins (58.57 km/hr) as 12058 Una New Delhi Jan Shatabdi Express.

As the average speed of the train is above 55 km/hr, as per Indian Railways rules, its fare includes a Superfast Express surcharge.

Routeing

The 12057/58 New Delhi Una Janshatabdi Express runs from Una via Chandigarh, Ambala Cantonment Junction, Panipat Junction to New Delhi.

Traction

As the route is fully electrified, a Ghaziabad based WAP 4 / WAP 5 / WAP 7 powers the train for its entire run.

Timings

12058 Una New Delhi Jan Shatabdi Express leaves Una on a daily basis at 05:00 hrs IST and reaches New Delhi at 12:00 hrs IST on the same day.

12057 New Delhi Una Jan Shatabdi Express leaves  New Delhi on a daily basis at 14:35 hrs IST and reaches Una at 22:10 hrs IST on the same day.

Gallery

External links

References 

Rail transport in Himachal Pradesh
Rail transport in Haryana
Rail transport in Delhi
Jan Shatabdi Express trains
Railway services introduced in 2008
Transport in Delhi
Transport in Una, Himachal Pradesh